The 1961 Detroit Lions season was the 32nd season in franchise history. Detroit was runner-up in the Western conference at 8–5–1, then won a second Playoff Bowl game against the Philadelphia Eagles that was played in the Orange Bowl, 38–10.

Regular season

Schedule 

 Thursday (November 23: Thanksgiving)

Standings

Roster

Playoff Bowl 
The Playoff Bowl matched the runners-up of the two conferences to determine third place in the league. It was played in January at the Orange Bowl in Miami, Florida, the week following the NFL Championship game. This season's participants, Detroit and Philadelphia, had met three weeks earlier in the last game of the regular season, a three-point Eagles' road win, and were slightly favored in Miami.

This was the second year for the game and the Lions repeated as winners; it is classified by the NFL as an exhibition game, rather than postseason.

Awards and records

References 

 Detroit Lions on Pro Football Reference
 Detroit Lions on jt-sw.com
 Detroit Lions on The Football Database

Detroit Lions
Detroit Lions seasons
Detroit Lions